Marcel Langiller (2 June 1908 – 25 December 1980) was a French footballer and is an Olympian. He played in a striker role, and was nicknamed "La Caille".

Career
Langiller was born in Charenton-le-Pont, Val-de-Marne. During his career, he played before 1928 for CA Paris, Excelsior Athlétic Club de Roubaix (1928–1933), Red Star (1934–1936), AS Saint-Étienne (1935–1937) and CA Paris (1936–1938). He won two Coupe de France in 1928 and 1933.

For the France national team he received 30 international caps, with 7 goals scored, and participated in the first edition of FIFA World Cup in 1930. He has the honour of the first assist in a World Cup.

1928 Amsterdam Summer Olympic Games
He played on the French team sent to the 1928 Amsterdam Summer Olympics.

International goals
Scores and results list France's goal tally first, score column indicates score after each Langiller goal.

References

External links
 Profile on French federation official site

1908 births
1980 deaths
People from Charenton-le-Pont
French footballers
France international footballers
Red Star F.C. players
AS Saint-Étienne players
Ligue 1 players
Ligue 2 players
Association football forwards
Olympic footballers of France
Footballers at the 1928 Summer Olympics
1930 FIFA World Cup players
Excelsior AC (France) players
CA Paris-Charenton players
Footballers from Val-de-Marne